Masa (or masa de maíz) is a maize dough that comes from ground nixtamalized corn. It is used for making corn tortillas, gorditas, tamales, pupusas, and many other Latin American dishes. It is dried and powdered into a flour form called masa harina. Masa is reconstituted from masa harina by mixing with water before use in cooking.

In Spanish, masa harina translates to "dough flour", which can refer to many other types of dough.

Preparation
Field corn grain is dried and then treated by cooking the mature, hard grain in a diluted solution of slaked lime (calcium hydroxide) or wood ash, and then letting it soak for many hours. The soaked maize is then rinsed thoroughly to remove the unpalatable flavor of the alkali. This process is nixtamalization, and it produces hominy, which is ground into a relatively dry dough to create fresh masa. The fresh masa can be sold or used directly, or can be dehydrated and blended into a powder to create masa harina, or masa flour.

Lime and ash are highly alkaline: the alkalinity helps the dissolution of hemicellulose, the major glue-like component of the maize cell walls, and loosens the hulls from the kernels and softens the corn. Some of the corn oil is broken down into emulsifying agents (monoglycerides and diglycerides), while bonding of the corn proteins to each other is also facilitated. The divalent calcium in lime acts as a cross-linking agent for protein and polysaccharide acidic side chains.

The chemical changes in masa allow dough formation, and also allow the nutrient niacin to be absorbed by the digestive tract. By contrast, untreated cornmeal is unable to form a dough on the addition of water, and a diet heavily reliant on its consumption is a risk factor for pellagra.

Other uses
The ground product can be called masa nixtamalera. In Central American and Mexican cuisine, masa nixtamalera is cooked with water and milk to make a thick, gruel-like beverage called atole. When made with chocolate and sugar, it becomes atole de chocolate. Adding anise and piloncillo to this mixture creates champurrado, a popular breakfast drink.

See also 
 Maize flour

References

Flour
Doughs
South American cuisine
Central American cuisine
Latin American cuisine